This was the first edition of the tournament.

Elisabetta Cocciaretto won the title, defeating Sara Errani in an all-Italian final, 6–1, 4–6, 6–0.

Seeds

Draw

Finals

Top half

Bottom half

References

Main Draw

Centenario Open - Singles